The Labour Party was a short-lived leftist political party in Greenland. The party was founded in early 1979 as the political wing of the Sulinermik Inuussutissarsiuteqartut Kattuffiat (SIK) trade union centre. SIK had previously supported Siumut, but that cooperation had been terminated in the fall of 1978.

Sulissartut was closely aligned to Siumut in major political issues. Also, Sulissartut supported Siumut in elections to the European Parliament.

In the 1979 election, Sulissartut did not win a presence in the Landsting. The party also contested the 1979 Danish parliamentary election, obtaining 1,618 votes (which was insufficient to win any of the two Folketing seats allocated to Greenland).

In the elections to municipal councils, Sulissartut obtained 550 votes across Greenland, 156 in Nuuk, 114 in Ilulissat, 81 in Maniitsoq, 76 in Aasiaat, 60 in Qaqortoq, 33 in Narsaq, 23 in Qasigiannguit and 7 in Uummannaq.

Ahead of the 1983 elections, Sulissartut merged into Inuit Ataqatigiit.

References

Defunct political parties in Greenland
Labour parties
Political parties established in 1979
Socialist parties in Greenland